Red-black or Redblack may refer to:

 Ottawa Redblacks, a Canadian football team
 RED/BLACK concept, a concept in cryptography
 Red-black striped snake, a colubrid snake
 Red–black tree, a type of self-balancing binary search tree used in computer science

See also

 Black and Red (disambiguation)
 Red and Black (disambiguation)